Peter Browne is the name of:

 Peter Browne (Mayflower passenger) (1594–1633), pilgrim and English colonist who arrived in North America on the Mayflower
 Peter Browne (theologian) (1665–1735), Irish theologian and bishop
 Peter Browne (Australian politician) (1924–2000), member of the Australian House of Representatives
 Peter Browne (rugby union) (born 1987), London Welsh second row
 Peter Browne (MP) (1794–1872), MP for Rye 1818–26
 Peter Browne, 2nd Earl of Altamont (1730s–1780), Irish landowner and MP
 Peter Browne (priest) (died 1842), Dean of Ferns

See also
 Peter Brown (disambiguation)
 Peter Bowne (1575–1624?), English physician